Grupo Carso is a Mexican global conglomerate company owned by Carlos Slim. It was formed in 1990 after the merger of Corporación Industrial Carso and Grupo Inbursa. The name Carso stands for Carlos Slim and Soumaya Domit de Slim, his late wife.

In May 2014, the conglomerate had a stock market capitalisation of over $12 billion US dollars.

In 1996 Carso Global Telecom (which includes Telmex, Telcel and América Móvil) separated itself from Grupo Carso.

Divisions

Industrial

 Grupo Porcelanite
 Cigatam

Commercial
 Grupo Sanborns

Infrastructure and construction
 Grupo PC Constructores
 Swecomex
 CICSA
 CILSA (Constructora de Infraestructura Latinoamericana)

Telecommunication
 Carso Global Telecom

Research & Development
 CIDEC

See also 
Grupo Carso on Facebook

CIDEC

References

External links
 Official Grupo Carso website—

Conglomerate companies of Mexico
Holding companies of Mexico
Companies based in Mexico City
Conglomerate companies established in 1990
Holding companies established in 1990
1990 establishments in Mexico
Companies listed on the Mexican Stock Exchange
Mexican companies established in 1990
Carlos Slim